Ada-Nicole Sanger (born January 24, 1998) is an American actress from South Florida. She is known for her role as Donna Lamonsoff in the 2010 comedy film Grown Ups and its 2013 sequel, Grown Ups 2, directed by Dennis Dugan. She was a contestant on the sixth episode of  the second season of Nickelodeon game show BrainSurge.

Film

Television

Theatre
 Twice Upon a Time (Hollywood Fight Club) ... Cinderella
 The Date (Theatre West) ... Elaine
 One Fine Afternoon (Theatre West) ... Emma
 Spring Family Festival (West Palm Beach) ... Principal
 Starz of the Future (South Florida Fair) ... Principal
 The Nutcracker (South Fork Auditorium) ... Party Child
 Hurricane Katrina Benefit (Center for the Arts) ... Principal
 La Sylphide (Wanda H Yardbough Auditorium) ... Petite Fairy
 The Three Bridges (Nashua) ... Guest Solo

References

External links 
Official Website

1998 births
American child actresses
American film actresses
American television actresses
Living people
21st-century American women